Mexico City Metro Line 8 is one of the twelve metro lines operating in Mexico City, Mexico. Its distinctive color is green.

Opened in 1994, it was the tenth line to be built (despite its name being Line 8).

History

Line 8 construction started in 1991 and finished in 1994. It was inaugurated on 20 July 1994 by President of Mexico Carlos Salinas de Gortari in its entire stretch going from Garibaldi to Constitución de 1917. The next day, Salinas de Gortari drove the first train.

In 2018, the Sistema de Transporte Colectivo presented its plan projected to 2030, where an expansion of Line 8 was announced.

Rolling stock
Line 8 has had different types of rolling stock throughout the years.

Alstom MP-82: 1994–present
Concarril NM-79: 2008–present

Currently, out of the 390 trains in the Mexico City Metro network, 30 are in service in Line 8.

Station list

The stations from east to west: 
{| class="wikitable" rules="all"
|-
!rowspan="2" | No.
!rowspan="2" | Station
!rowspan="2" | Date opened
!rowspan="2" | Level
!colspan="2" | Distance (km)
!rowspan="2" | Connection
!rowspan="2" | Location
|-
!style="font-size: 65%;"|Betweenstations
!style="font-size: 65%;"|Total
|-
|style="background: #; color: white;"|01
|Garibaldi / Lagunilla 
| rowspan="19" |July 20, 1994
| rowspan="9" |Undergroundtrench
|style="text-align:right;"|-
|style="text-align:right;"|0.0
|
  Line B
  Line 7: Garibaldi station
  Line 5: Garibaldi stop
 Routes: 18, 27-A
 Routes: 10-E, 11-C
|rowspan="7"|Cuauhtémoc
|-
|style="background: #; color: white;"|02
|Bellas Artes 
|style="text-align:right;"|0.8
|style="text-align:right;"|0.8
|
  Line 2

  Line 4: Bellas Artes station (north route)
  Line 1: Bellas Artes stop
 Route: 16-A
|-
|style="background: #; color: white;"|03
|San Juan de Letrán
|style="text-align:right;"|0.6
|style="text-align:right;"|1.4
|

  Line 4: Eje Central station (south route)
  Line 1: República de Uruguay stop
|-
|style="background: #; color: white;"|04
|Salto del Agua 
|style="text-align:right;"|0.4
|style="text-align:right;"|1.8
|
  Line 1 (out of service)

 Salto del Agua stop (temporary Line1 service)
  Line 1: Salto del Agua stop

 Routes: 19-E, 19-F, 19-G, 19-H
|-
|style="background: #; color: white;"|05
|Doctores
|style="text-align:right;"|0.7
|style="text-align:right;"|2.5
|
  Line 1: Doctores stop
|-
|style="background: #; color: white;"|06
|Obrera
|style="text-align:right;"|0.9
|style="text-align:right;"|3.4
|
  Line 1: Obrera stop
  Line 2: Bolívar stop (at distance)
 Route: 19-F (at distance)
|-
|style="background: #; color: white;"|07
|Chabacano 
|style="text-align:right;"|1.3
|style="text-align:right;"|4.7
|
  Line 2
  Line 9
 Routes: 2-A, 31-B, 33, 111-A, 145-A
 Routes: 9-C, 9-E, 14-A, 17-C, 17-H, 17-I
|-
|style="background: #; color: white;"|08
|La Viga
|style="text-align:right;"|1.0
|style="text-align:right;"|5.7
|
 Route: 5-A
|Venustiano Carranza
|-
|style="background: #; color: white;"|09
|Santa Anita
|style="text-align:right;"|0.8
|style="text-align:right;"|6.5
|
  Line 4
 Santa Anita (unused)
 Route: 37
 Routes: 5-A, 14-A
|rowspan=3|Iztacalco
|-
|style="background: #; color: white;"|10
|Coyuya 
| rowspan="4" |Grade-level, overground access
|style="text-align:right;"|1.1
|style="text-align:right;"|7.6
|
 Coyuya
  Line 2: Metro Coyuya station

  Line 5: Metro Coyuya station (also temporary Line 12 service)
 Route: 14-A
|-
|style="background: #; color: white;"|11
|Iztacalco 
|style="text-align:right;"|1.1
|style="text-align:right;"|8.7
|
<li>  Line 9: Iztacalco stop (west-east route)
|-
|style="background: #; color: white;"|12
|Apatlaco
|style="text-align:right;"|1.1
|style="text-align:right;"|9.8
|
<li>  Line 5: Apatlaco station
<li>  Line 9: Metro Apatlaco stop (Sundays-only)
|rowspan=8|Iztapalapa
|-
|style="background: #; color: white;"|13
|Aculco
|style="text-align:right;"|0.7
|style="text-align:right;"|10.5
|
<li>  Line 5: Aculco station
|-
|style="background: #; color: white;"|14
|Escuadrón 201
| rowspan="5" |Undergroundtrench
|style="text-align:right;"|0.9
|style="text-align:right;"|11.4
|
<li> Escuadrón 201 (unused)
<li>  Line 5: Escuadrón 201 station
<li> Route: 22-D
|-
|style="background: #; color: white;"|15
|Atlalilco 
|style="text-align:right;"|1.9
|style="text-align:right;"|13.3
|
<li>  Line 12 (out of service)
<li> Temporary Line 12 service: Atlalilco stop
<li> Routes: 1-D, 52-C (also temporary Line 12 service)
<li> Route: 6-A
|-
|style="background: #; color: white;"|16
|Iztapalapa
|style="text-align:right;"|0.9
|style="text-align:right;"|14.2
|
<li> Iztapalapa (unused)
<li> Routes: 1-D, 52-C
<li> Route: 6-A
|-
|style="background: #; color: white;"|17
|Cerro de la Estrella
|style="text-align:right;"|0.9
|style="text-align:right;"|15.1
|
<li> Routes: 1-D, 52-C
<li> Route: 6-A (at distance)
|-
|style="background: #; color: white;"|18
|UAM-I
|style="text-align:right;"|1.3
|style="text-align:right;"|16.4
|
<li> Routes: 1-D, 52-C
|-
|style="background: #; color: white;"|19
|Constitución de 1917 
|Grade-level, overground access
|style="text-align:right;"|1.3
|style="text-align:right;"|17.7
|
<li> Constitución de 1917
<li>  Line 2: Constitución de 1917 station
<li> Routes: 1-D, 47-A, 57-A, 57-C, 159, 161, 161-C, 161-D, 161-E, 161-F, 162, 165-A (also temporary Line 12 service)
  Line 10: Constitución de 1917 station
 Route: 4-B
|}

Renamed stations

Ridership
The following table shows each of Line 8 stations total and average daily ridership during 2019.

Tourism
Line 8 passes near several places of interest:

Plaza Garibaldi, a square known as Mexico City's home of mariachi music where mariachi bands can be found playing or soliciting gigs from visitors.
Palacio de Bellas Artes, Palace of Fine Arts, cultural center.
Historic center of Mexico City
Torre Latinoamericana, a skyscraper in downtown Mexico City with an observation deck.

Notes

See also
 List of Mexico City Metro lines

References

1994 establishments in Mexico
8
Railway lines opened in 1994